Christopher S. Clapham (born 1941) is a British Africanist and political scientist. He studied at Lancaster University and was a senior lecturer in politics (1974–89), and a professor of politics and international relations (1989-2002) there. Since 2002 Clapham is a professor, now emeritus, based at the Centre of African Studies of Cambridge University.

 He served as the editor of Journal of Modern African Studies from 1997 up to 2012. He was a president to the African Studies Association of the United Kingdom from 1992 to 1994.

Selected publications

Main publications
 Haile-Selassie's government, New York: Frederick A. Praeger, 1969
 Liberia and Sierra Leone: an essay in comparative politics, Cambridge, UK: Cambridge University Press, African Studies Series, 20, 1976, 2009 
 Foreign policy making in developing states, a comparative approach, Farnborough, England: Saxon House, 1977
 Private patronage and public power, political clientelism in the modern state, New York: St. Martin's Press, 1982 
 The political dilemmas of military regimes, Christopher Clapham and George D. E. Philip, Eds., London: Routledge, 1985, 2021
 Third World politics: an introduction, London: Routledge, 1985, 1998
 Transformation and Continuity in Revolutionary Ethiopia, Cambridge, UK: Cambridge University Press, 1988 
 Africa and the International System: the Politics of State Survival, Cambridge University Press, 1996
 African Guerrillas, Christopher Clapham, Ed., Oxford: James Currey, 1998
 Liberia and Sierra Leone: an Essay in Comparative Politics, Cambridge, UK: Cambridge University Press. African Studies Series 20, 2009
 Africa and the International System, Christopher Clapham, Thomas Biersteker, Chris Brown, Phil Cerny, Joseph Grieco. Cambridge, UK: Cambridge University Press. Series: Studies in international relations, 2009
 The Horn of Africa: state formation and decay, London: Hurst, 2017

Further publications
 The caves of Sof Omar, Addis Ababa: Ethiopian Tourist Organization, 1967 
 Conflicts in Africa, London, International Institute for Strategic Studies, Series: Adelphi papers, no. 93, [1972] 
 Feudalism, modernisation, and the Ethiopian monarchy, Addis Ababa: Addis Ababa University, 1976
 The African state, Royal African Society. Conference on Sub-Saharan Africa, London: Royal African Association, 1991
 The African state in the post-cold war era, Magaliesberg, 1993
 Papers. African Studies Association of the UK: biennial conference, University of Lancaster, 5–7 September 1994. Christopher S. Clapham, Ed., [African Studies Association of the United Kingdom], [1994]
 Ethiopia and Eritrea. The politics of post-insurgency, Chapter 6 in Democracy and Political Change in Sub-Saharan Africa, John A. Wiseman, Ed., London: Routledge, 1995
 Boundary and territory in the Horn of Africa, in African boundaries: Barriers, conduits and opportunities, P. Nugent and A. I. Asiwaju, Eds., London: Pinter, 1996a: 237–250
 Culture of Politics in Modern Kenya. Angelique Haugerud, David Anderson, Carolyn Brown, Christopher S. Clapham, and Michael Gomez. Cambridge, UK: Cambridge University Press, 1997  
 Being peacekept, Aldershot: Ashgate, in Peacekeeping in Africa, Oliver Furley and Roy May, Eds., London: Routledge Library Editions: Postcolonial Security Studies, 1998
 The foreign policies of Ethiopia and Eritrea, in African foreign policies. Stephen Wright, Ed., Boulder: Westview Press, 1999
 Regional integration in Southern Africa. Comparative international perspectives, Johannesburg, South Africa: South African Institute of International Affairs (SAIIA), 1999, 2001
 The decay and attempted reconstruction of African territorial statehood, Leipzig: Institut für Afrikanistik, 2004
 Big African States: Angola, DRC, Ethiopia, Nigeria, South Africa, Sudan. Christopher Clapham, Jeffrey Herbst, Greg Mills, Eds., University of the Witwatersrand: Wits University Press, 2006

References

External links
 
 
 

Academics of the University of Cambridge
Alumni of Lancaster University
British Africanists
Living people
1941 births
Presidents of the African Studies Association of the United Kingdom